Staffordshire (postal abbreviation Staffs.) is a landlocked county in the West Midlands region of England. It borders Cheshire to the northwest, Derbyshire and Leicestershire to the east, Warwickshire to the southeast, the West Midlands County and Worcestershire to the south and Shropshire to the west.

The largest settlement in Staffordshire is Stoke-on-Trent, which is administered as an independent unitary authority, separately from the rest of the county. Lichfield is a cathedral city. Other major settlements include Stafford, Burton upon Trent, Cannock, Newcastle-under-Lyme, Rugeley, Leek, and Tamworth.

Other towns include Stone, Cheadle, Uttoxeter, Hednesford, Brewood, Burntwood/Chasetown, Kidsgrove, Eccleshall, Biddulph and the large villages of Penkridge, Wombourne, Perton, Kinver, Codsall, Tutbury, Alrewas, Barton-under-Needwood, Shenstone, Featherstone, Essington, Stretton and Abbots Bromley. Cannock Chase AONB is within the county as well as parts of the National Forest and the Peak District national park.

Wolverhampton, Walsall, West Bromwich, and Smethwick are within the historic county boundaries of Staffordshire, but since 1974 have been part of the West Midlands county.

Apart from Stoke-on-Trent, Staffordshire is divided into the districts of Cannock Chase, East Staffordshire, Lichfield, Newcastle-under-Lyme, South Staffordshire, Stafford, Staffordshire Moorlands, and Tamworth.

History

Historically, Staffordshire was divided into five hundreds: Cuttlestone, Offlow, Pirehill, Seisdon, and Totmonslow.

The historic boundaries of Staffordshire cover much of what is now the metropolitan county of West Midlands. An administrative county of Staffordshire was set up in 1889 under the Local Government Act 1888 covering the county, except for the county boroughs of Wolverhampton, Walsall, and West Bromwich in the south (the area known as the Black Country), and Hanley in the north. The Act also saw the towns of Tamworth (partly in Warwickshire) and Burton upon Trent (partly in Derbyshire) united entirely in Staffordshire. In 1553, Queen Mary made Lichfield a county corporate, meaning it was administered separately from the rest of Staffordshire. It remained so until 1888.

Handsworth and Perry Barr became part of the county borough of Birmingham, and thus Warwickshire, in 1911 and 1928 respectively. Burton, in the east of the county, became a county borough in 1901, and was followed by Smethwick, another town in the Black Country in 1907. In 1910 the six towns of the Staffordshire Potteries, including Hanley, became the single county borough of Stoke-on-Trent.

A significant boundary change occurred in 1926 when the east of Sedgley was transferred to Worcestershire to allow the construction of the new Priory Estate on land purchased by Dudley County Borough council.

A major reorganisation in the Black Country in 1966, under the recommendation of the Local Government Commission for England, led to the creation of an area of contiguous county boroughs. The County Borough of Warley was formed by the merger of the county borough of Smethwick and municipal borough of Rowley Regis with the Worcestershire borough of Oldbury: the resulting county borough was associated with Worcestershire. Meanwhile, the county borough of Dudley, historically a detached part of Worcestershire, expanded and became associated with Staffordshire instead. This reorganisation led to the administrative county of Staffordshire having a thin protrusion passing between the county boroughs (to the east) and Shropshire, to the west, to form a short border with Worcestershire.

Under the Local Government Act 1972, on 1 April 1974, the county boroughs of the Black Country and the Aldridge-Brownhills Urban District of Staffordshire became, along with Birmingham, Solihull, and Coventry and other districts, a new metropolitan county of West Midlands. County boroughs were abolished, with Stoke becoming a non-metropolitan district in Staffordshire, and Burton forming an unparished area in the district of East Staffordshire. On 1 April 1997, under a recommendation of the Banham Commission, Stoke-on-Trent became a unitary authority independent of Staffordshire once more.

In July 2009, the largest hoard of Anglo-Saxon gold ever found in Britain was discovered in a field near Lichfield. The artefacts, known as The Staffordshire Hoard, have tentatively been dated to the 7th or 8th centuries, placing the origin of the items in the time of the Kingdom of Mercia.

Economy

This is a chart of trend of regional gross value added of the non-metropolitan county of Staffordshire at current basic prices published (pp. 240–253) by Office for National Statistics with figures in millions of British pounds sterling.

Some nationally and internationally known companies have their base in Staffordshire. They include the Britannia Building Society which is based in Leek. JCB is based in Rocester near Uttoxeter and Bet365 which is based in Stoke-on-Trent. The theme park Alton Towers is in the Staffordshire Moorlands and several of the world's largest pottery manufacturers are based in Stoke-on-Trent. The town of Burton upon Trent is known for its beer brewing industry with several major brands such as Carling, Cobra and Marston's brewed there.

Education

Staffordshire has a completely comprehensive system with eight independent schools. Most secondary schools are from 11 to 16 or 18, but two in Staffordshire Moorlands and South Staffordshire are from 13 to 18. Resources are shared where appropriate.

There are two universities in the county, Keele University west of Newcastle-under-Lyme and Staffordshire University, which has campuses in Stoke-on-Trent, Stafford, Lichfield and Shrewsbury.

Sport
The modern county of Staffordshire currently has three professional football clubs – Stoke City and Port Vale, both from Stoke-on-Trent, and Burton Albion, who play in Burton upon Trent.

Stoke City, one of the oldest professional football clubs in existence, were founded in 1863 and played at the Victoria Ground for 119 years from 1878 until their relocation to the Britannia Stadium (now named the Bet365 Stadium) in 1997. They were among the 12 founder members of the Football League in 1888. By the late 1930s, they were established First Division members and boasted arguably the finest footballer in England at the time in right-winger Stanley Matthews, who had two spells with the club between 1930 and his retirement in 1965 at the age of 50. In 1972, the club finally won a major trophy when they lifted the Football League Cup, but after relegation from the First Division in 1985 they would not experience top flight football for 23 years. After spending some two decades bouncing between the second and third tiers of the English league, they finally reclaimed their top flight status in 2008 by securing promotion to the Premier League. Stoke City reached their first FA Cup final in 2011, but lost to Manchester City.

Port Vale, who like Stoke City play in Stoke-on-Trent, were formed in 1876 and became members of the Football League in 1892. After more than 70 years at various stadiums around the city, the club moved to its present home, Vale Park, in 1950. In early 1936, they had eliminated First Division champions Sunderland from the FA Cup. Another FA Cup success came in February 1988 when they eliminated seven-time winners Tottenham Hotspur from the competition. Promotion to the Second Division for the first time since the 1960s was secured in 1989, and Vale would spend nine of the next 11 years at this level. However, the club has been less successful since the turn of the 21st century, and suffered relegation to League Two – the fourth tier of the English league – in 2008. The club has seen an upturn in its fortunes as the club was promoted to League One in the 2012–13 season. In the 2016-17 season Port Vale were relegated back to League Two.

West Bromwich Albion, Wolverhampton Wanderers and Walsall are also notable clubs based in the historic county boundaries.

The county's other professional football team is Burton Albion, based in Burton upon Trent, who currently play in League One.

The county has a number of non-league football clubs, including Tamworth, Stafford Rangers, Hednesford Town and Leek Town.

In cricket, Staffordshire is one of the nineteen Minor counties of English and Welsh cricket. It is represented in Minor counties cricket by Staffordshire County Cricket Club who have played in the Minor Counties Championship since 1895, a competition which it has won outright eleven times, making it the most successful Minor counties team.  Famous international cricketers produced by the county include Sydney Barnes, Bob Taylor and Dominic Cork, all of whom went on to represent England.

Geography

In the north and in the south, the county is hilly, with the southern foothills and uplands of the Pennines in the north, with parts of it in the Peak District National Park, and Cannock Chase an area of natural beauty in the south. In the middle regions, the landscape is low and undulating. Throughout the entire county there are vast and important coalfields. In the southern part, there are also rich iron ore deposits. The largest river is the Trent. The soil is chiefly clay and agriculture was not highly developed until the mechanisation of farms.

Staffordshire is home to the highest village in Britain, Flash. This record was confirmed in 2007 by the Ordnance Survey after Wanlockhead in Scotland also claimed the record. The BBC's The One Show investigated the case in a bid to settle the argument and Flash was confirmed as the higher of the two. The highest point in Staffordshire is Cheeks Hill.

Green belt

Staffordshire contains sectors of three green belt areas, two of which surround the large conurbations of Stoke-on-Trent and the West Midlands, and were first drawn up from the 1950s. All the county's districts contain some portion of belt.

Demographics
According to the 2001 Census the population of the Non-metropolitan Staffordshire is 806,744 and the population of Stoke-on-Trent was 240,636 making a total population of 1,047,380. In non-metropolitan Staffordshire, White British is the largest ethnicity, making up 96% of the population. This is followed by Irish, making up 0.6%. Non-White citizens make up 2% of the population. 94% of the population was born in England, and those born in Scotland and Wales together make up 1% of the total population.

Government

Westminster parliamentary
The ceremonial county of Staffordshire (including the unitary authority of Stoke-on-Trent) is represented by twelve Members of Parliament (MPs) in the House of Commons. Eleven of the MPs represent the Conservative Party and one sits as an independent. The results of the 2019 general election in the county are as follows:

County council
Staffordshire County Council is the top-tier local council for the non-metropolitan county. For Eurostat purposes, it is a NUTS 3 region (code UKG22).

Staffordshire operates a cabinet-style council. There are 62 councillors for Staffordshire. The Full Council elects a cabinet of 10 councillors, including the council leader, from the majority party. Each cabinet member has their own portfolio about which they make the "day to day" decisions.

|}

Boundary changes

Areas

Historic

Some settlements were formerly governed as part of the county, these are now under the West Midlands county:

Staffordshire Bull Terriers
The Staffordshire Bull Terrier was bred for hunting purposes in this county and should not be confused with the considerably larger American Staffordshire Terrier, American Pit Bull Terrier, and (English) Bull Terrier.

Religion
In the 2011 United Kingdom census, the population of Staffordshire reported their religion as follows:

Church of England
The only cathedral in the county is Lichfield Cathedral in the city of Lichfield. The Diocese of Lichfield covers the whole county with the exception of Stapenhill and Amington, the north of the nearby county of Shropshire and the Black Country area of the West Midlands. The county is covered by the archdeaconries of Stoke-upon-Trent and Lichfield. The current Bishop of Lichfield is Michael Ipgrave and the current Bishop of Stafford Geoff Annas. There are 298 Church of England churches in the county.

Roman Catholic Church
Staffordshire is part of the Roman Catholic Archdiocese of Birmingham. The current archbishop is Bernard Longley.

Methodism
Primitive Methodism was founded in Staffordshire by Hugh Bourne, a native of Stoke-on-Trent, at a public gathering in the village of Mow Cop. He originally followed the Wesleyan form of Methodism but in 1801 he reformed the Methodist service by conducting it outside. By 1811 with his brother he founded the first chapel in the Tunstall area of Stoke-on-Trent.

Judaism
The most popular synagogue in the county is on London Road in Newcastle-Under-Lyme, which opened in 2006 and replaced the former Birch Terrace synagogue in Hanley. According to the 2001 census there were 407 Jews in the non-metropolitan area of Staffordshire, and 83 in Stoke-on-Trent.

Islam
There are 15 mosques in Stoke-on-Trent, 5 in Burton-upon-Trent and 1 in both Stafford and Lichfield. As of 2019 a new mosque has finished construction in the Hanley area of Stoke-on-Trent and is the first purpose-built mosque in the area. At the 2001 census there were 7,658 Muslims in Stoke-on-Trent and 6,081 in the rest of Staffordshire, with a total of 13,739 making up 1.3% of the population. 62.9% (3823) of the Muslims in the rest of Staffordshire are from the town of Burton-upon-Trent.

Transport

Canals
Staffordshire has an extensive network of canals including the Birmingham and Fazeley Canal, Caldon Canal, Coventry Canal, Shropshire Union Canal, Staffordshire and Worcestershire Canal and Trent and Mersey Canal.

Railways

Staffordshire has several railways that pass through and serve settlements within the county. The most important of these is the West Coast Main Line, which facilitates through services between London and Scotland. Few, if any, of these stop inside the county's borders. Stafford railway station is at a junction with the line to Birmingham New Street, a major hub, and is predominantly served by London Northwestern Railway. Stoke-on-Trent railway station is the busiest station in Staffordshire  and is served by long-distance CrossCountry and Avanti West Coast trains to Manchester. This station is also the terminus of the North Staffordshire line to Derby via Uttoxeter, which narrowly avoided closure in the 1960s. Stone railway station opened in 2008.

Roads
The county has relatively good links to the national roads network. Several major roads intersect the county, making it a popular location for commuters working in Birmingham. The M42 junction 10 is in Tamworth and the motorway heads southwest towards Birmingham. The M6 runs north through the county and junctions 10A-16 are in the county. The M6 Toll, the UK's first toll motorway, runs through the county with junctions in Weeford near Lichfield, Cannock and joins the M6 heading north towards Stafford.

The A5 and A34 run through the county. The former has been significantly widened to a dual carriageway at several sections, although much of it remains single carriageway.

Air
There are currently no airports with scheduled flights in the county, with the nearest ones being Birmingham, East Midlands and Manchester. Depending on the location, there is, however, Wolverhampton Airport in Bobbington and Tatenhill Airfield near Burton-upon-Trent, both of which are small airports catering for general aviation.

Bus

Services within the county are chiefly provided by Arriva Midlands, D&G Bus and First Potteries. National Express coaches serve towns and cities on a daily basis.

Media

Newspapers
Daily Newspapers in Staffordshire are The Sentinel, covering Stoke-on-Trent, Newcastle-under-Lyme and the Staffordshire Moorlands, Burton Mail which covers the town of Burton-upon-Trent and the Express & Star which has several editions covering Tamworth, Lichfield, Cannock Chase and Stafford.

Radio
The local BBC radio stations covering Staffordshire are BBC Radio Stoke covering Mid and North Staffordshire, BBC Radio WM covering the south of the county and BBC Radio Derby covering East Staffordshire. The local commercial radio stations are Signal 1 and Greatest Hits Radio Staffordshire & Cheshire which cover North and Mid Staffordshire, and Capital Mid-Counties, which covers Burton, Lichfield and Tamworth. Further stations which cover parts of Staffordshire include Heart, Smooth, and Greatest Hits Radio which cover the southern parts of the county. Free Radio Birmingham covers Lichfield and Tamworth, and Free Radio Black Country and Shropshire covers the Cannock area.

United Christian Broadcasters, which has facilities in Burslem and Hanchurch, has been involved in radio broadcasting since 1987. Today it is broadcast nationally in the UK through DAB digital radio.

Community radio
Staffordshire is served by a number of community radio stations. In North Staffordshire, there are four community radio stations – Moorlands Radio in Leek, 6 Towns Radio, based in Burslem, The Hitmix, based in Newcastle-under-Lyme and Cross Rhythms City Radio based in Hanley

In Stafford there are two community radio stations – Windmill Broadcasting, the UK's only radio station based in a Windmill, in the Broad Eye Windmill, and Stafford FM, which broadcasts to the town on 107.3 FM.

In the Cannock Chase District, there is Cannock Chase Radio, which broadcasts on 89.6, 89.8 and 94.0 FM, and in Tamworth, there is Radio Tamworth, which broadcasts on 106.8 FM.

Television
Staffordshire is predominantly covered by the ITV Central and BBC West Midlands television regions, both of which have their studios in Birmingham. The far north of the county, around Biddulph, is served by ITV Granada and BBC North West from MediaCityUK in Salford.

Places of interest

Gallery

See also

Lord Lieutenant of Staffordshire
High Sheriff of Staffordshire
List of MPs for Staffordshire
Samuel Hieronymus Grimm
The Stafford knot
Tamworth Pig
Healthcare in Staffordshire
Staffordshire Police
Staffordshire Police and Crime Commissioner

References

External links

East Staffordshire Community Website
BBC Staffordshire website
Staffordshire County Council
Staffordshire Past Track – Historical archive about the county
Staffordshire Tourism website
The Staffordshire Encyclopaedia
Images of Staffordshire  at the English Heritage Archive
The History of Parliament: the House of Commons - Staffordshire, County, 1386 to 1841

 
Non-metropolitan counties
West Midlands (region)
NUTS 3 statistical regions of the United Kingdom
Counties of England established in antiquity